1993–94 Pirveli Liga was the 5th season of the Georgian Pirveli Liga. The Pirveli Liga is the second division of the Georgian Football league. It consists of both reserve teams and professional teams.

Eastern zone

Playoff match: Durudzhi 0 - Anzi 0 with penalties 4-2

Promotions to Division 1: Kvareli

Team name changes before or during the 1993/94 season: 
Krtsanisi Tbilisi to Krtsanisi-Zooveti Tbilisi
Merani Tbilisi merged with Bacho to form Merani-Bacho Tbilisi (Merani-91 Tbilisi is a different team)

Western zone

Team name changes before(or during) the 1993/94 season:
Mertskhali Ozurgeti to Anako Ozurgeti
Kolkheti-1 Abasha to Kolkheti Abasha
Shevardeni Zugdidi to Universitet Zugdidi

Promotion play-off:  Durudzhi Kvareli - Egrisi Senaki    1-0

See also
1993–94 Umaglesi Liga
1993–94 Georgian Cup

Erovnuli Liga 2 seasons
2
Georgia